Cristina Bucșa (born 1 January 1998) is a Moldovan-born Spanish professional tennis player.

She has a career-high singles ranking of world No. 86, achieved on 30 January 2023, and of world No. 61 in the doubles rankings, set on 6 February 2023.

Professional career

2018: First pro title
Bucșa won her first major ITF Circuit title 2018 at L'Open de Saint-Malo, in the doubles draw partnering María Fernanda Herazo.

2021: Grand Slam debut
She qualified for a Grand Slam singles main draw for the first time in her career at the 2021 US Open.

2022: First Grand Slam win and WTA 1000 debut
At the 2022 French Open, Bucșa qualified into her second major main draw for the season following the Australian Open.

She won her first major match at the US Open defeating Kaja Juvan, before losing to 19th seed Danielle Collins.

2023: Top 100, Major first two wins & third round, Maiden WTA 1000 singles win & 250 doubles title
She reached the top 100 on 16 January 2023. Next, she qualified for the Australian Open and recorded her first two wins at this major defeating Eva Lys and Bianca Andreescu. She lost to top seed and world No. 1, Iga Swiatek.

At the 2023 WTA Lyon Open she won her maiden doubles title with Bibiane Schoofs. As a result she reached a new career-high doubles ranking of No. 61 on 6 February 2023.

At the 2023 BNP Paribas Open she reached the second round of a WTA 1000 for the first time in her career as a qualifier defeating Katie Swan.

Personal life and background
Cristina is coached by her father, Ion Bucșa. She trains and lives in Cantabria, Spain. Tennis idols are Serena Williams and Kim Clijsters. Favorite surface to play on is grass.

Performance timeline

Only main-draw results in WTA Tour, Grand Slam tournaments, Fed Cup/Billie Jean King Cup and Olympic Games are included in win–loss records.

Singles
Current after the 2023 Indian Wells Open.

Doubles
Current after the 2023 WTA Lyon Open.

WTA Tour career finals

Doubles: 2 (1 title, 1 runner-up)

WTA Challenger finals

Doubles: 2 (1 title, 1 runner-up)

ITF Circuit finals

Singles: 9 (4 titles, 5 runner–ups)

Doubles: 19 (9 titles, 10 runner–ups)

Notes

References

External links
 
 

1998 births
Living people
Spanish female tennis players
Moldovan female tennis players
Sportspeople from Chișinău
Spanish people of Moldovan descent
Naturalised citizens of Spain